William Tanner O'Connor (13 March 1908 – 12 July 1989) was an Australian rules footballer who played with South Melbourne in the Victorian Football League (VFL).

Family
The son of John George O'Connor (1853–1916), and Mary Ann O'Connor (1871–1967), née Tanner, William Tanner O'Connor was born in Fitzroy, Victoria on 13 March 1908.

He married Millie Frances Veronica Tanner (1907–2005) in 1937. They had three children.

Football

South Melbourne (VFL)
Recruited from the Middle Park Football Club, O'Connor played one game, on the half-forward flank, for the South Melbourne First XVIII, against Melbourne, at the MCG, on 27 April 1929.

Military service
O'Connor enlisted in the Second AIF on 12 January 1942, and served during World War II.

Death
He died at the Royal Melbourne Hospital in Parkville, Victoria on 12 July 1989.

Notes

References
 
 [https://nominal-rolls.dva.gov.au/veteran?id=475862&c=WW2 World War Two Nominal Roll: Sergeant William Tanner O'Connor (VX69624), Department of Veterans' Affairs.]
 B883, VX69624: World War Two Service Record: Sergeant William Tanner O'Connor (VX69624), National Archives of Australia''.

External links 

1908 births
1989 deaths
Australian rules footballers from Victoria (Australia)
Sydney Swans players
Australian Army personnel of World War II
Australian Army soldiers